Scorpio Music is a French music label headquartered in Paris. The company was founded by Henri Belolo in 1976, best known as the original creator of The Ritchie Family and the disco group Village People with Jacques Morali.

Since 2011, the label has garnered a roster of artists including J Balvin, Martin Garrix, Showtek, Armin van Buuren, Deorro and Hardwell, Willy William.

Labels

 Big Mix
 Black Scorpio
 In the Mix
 Mascotte Music
 Touch of Gold
 Scorpio Beats

Artists

 Village People
 2 Unlimited
 Haddaway
 Gala
 20 Fingers
 Blue
 Lorna
 DHT
 Sharam
 Enur and Natasja Saad
 Michael Mind Project
 Greg Parys
 Alex Gaudino 
 Benoit
 DJ Assad
 Katerine Avgoustakis
 Greg Parys 
 Tristan Garner 
 Ilona Mitrecey 
 Antoine Debarge 
 Najoua Belyzel  
 Eleze
 Paris Avenue
 Kyle Evans
 Mr. Vegas
 Steve Aoki
 Deorro
 Dillon Francis
 Firebeatz
 4TOLD
 Willy William
 Yoti die Griekse Boertjie

References

Companies based in Paris
French record labels
IFPI members
Record label distributors
Record labels established in 1976